Fredrik Jutfelt (born 1975) is a Swedish scientist. His field of study is animal physiology, and his current research focus is on the effects of warming and ocean acidification on the physiology and behaviour of fish. He is a professor at the Department of Biology at the Norwegian University of Science and Technology (NTNU) in Trondheim, Norway, where he is the leader of the animal physiology section. His research group is called the Jutfelt Fish Ecophysiology Lab, and they investigate how fish respond physiologically and behaviourally to changes in the environment. Much of the research is based on laboratory studies of zebrafish, and he has built a zebrafish research facility at NTNU. The research group also studies the impacts of climate change on marine animals.

He has received the research grant ERC Consolidator from the European Research Council for the years 2021–2026 (2 million Euro).

Jutfelt has been active in detecting and countering data fabrication and scientific misconduct, which has led to retractions of articles including from the prestigious scientific journal Science.

In 2006 he graduated with a PhD at the University of Gothenburg, Sweden, with the thesis The intestinal epithelium of salmonids : transepithelial transport, barrier function and bacterial interactions. After finishing his PhD, he was a postdoc at the University of Gothenburg in collaboration with the Norwegian Institute of Marine Research in Bergen, Norway. In 2010–2014 he was employed as an Assistant professor at the University of Gothenburg, and in 2015 he was employed as an associate professor at the Department of Biology, NTNU, where he was promoted to full professor in 2021.

Jutfelt was a member of the NTNU Outstanding Academic Fellows Programme during 2017–2021. The participants of this group are scientists who are internationally recognized in their field.

During his PhD and postdoc, his research topic was animal physiology, and specifically on epithelial physiology in fish.

More recently, his research topic changed to climate change physiology, investigating how both ocean acidification and temperature affects fish. The research on ocean acidification was highly publicised following a paper published in the scientific journal Nature. The article «Ocean acidification does not impair the behaviour of coral reef fishes» was published in 2020 and is already (2022) highly cited. It had earlier been suggested that coral reef fishes were threatened by ocean acidification causing severe behavioural abnormalities. The new results of the study showed that ocean acidification, which is a serious threat to fishes, doesn't dramatically affect the behaviour of coral reef fish. However, both coral reefs and the associated fishes are threatened by rising  levels.

The Jutfelt Fish Ecophysiology lab investigates how evolution can lead to physiological adaptation to the temperature environment where the fish live. They recently performed a large artificial selection experiment, published in Proceedings of the National Academy of Sciences of the United States of America (PNAS), showing that evolution of tolerance to warming can occur in fish. The rate of evolution, however, was suggested to be too slow for evolutionary rescue to protect fish from the impacts of climate change.

Publications 
 
  (The Norwegian Scientific Index)

References

External links 

 

Academic staff of the Norwegian University of Science and Technology
University of Gothenburg alumni
Swedish physiologists
1975 births
Living people
European Research Council grantees